China General Technology Group (Genertec) is a Chinese state-owned conglomerate spanning the areas of machinery manufacturing, pharmaceuticals, engineering contracting, construction and real estate, and technical consulting.

Business areas

Machinery
The core of the business has been the manufacture of heavy duty machinery.  Genertec was founded in the 1950s as part of the First Five Year Plan (1953-1957) to break ground within China in machinery manufacturing.  Some of the key products in its machinery business include "heavy-duty CNC milling-boring machines, heavy-duty mechanical presses, large automatic metal forming machines and a series of milling machines."

Engineering and construction
The company is engaged in the engineering and construction sector. Its biggest subsidiary in this field is the China National Machinery Import and Export Corporation (CMC).

Xinxing Construction which constructed the Laoshan Velodrome that was host to track cycle events during the 2008 Olympics in Beijing.  Within the construction sub-group is the international driven China National Corporation for Overseas Economic Cooperation which performs contracting projects from thermal plants in Belarus to water supply in Jamaica.

References

Construction and civil engineering companies of China
Machine tool builders
Companies based in Beijing
Chinese companies established in 1998
Construction and civil engineering companies established in 1998